Dyckia encholirioides is a plant species in the genus Dyckia. This species is endemic to Brazil.

Cultivars 
 Dyckia 'Naked Lady'

References 

BSI Cultivar Registry Retrieved 11 October 2009

encholirioides
Flora of Brazil